Jatong Silim Sambian (born November 1928) is a Ghanaian politician and a teacher. He represented the Bunkprugu constituency in the Northern Region as a member of the first parliament of the second republic of Ghana under the membership of the ruling Progress Party.

Early life and education 
Jatong Silim Sambian is an indigene of  Northern Region of Ghana where he was born in November 1928. He is an alumnus of Tamale Middle Boarding School. He also held a Teachers' Training Certificate.

Political career 
Sambian was elected  into the Parliament  after emerging winner of his polls in the 1969 Ghanaian parliamentary election as member of the first parliament of the second republic of Ghana on the ticket of the Progress Party (PP). He was sworn into office on 1 October 1969 and left office on 13 January 1972 after the parliament was dissolved. He was succeeded by John Laar Nurokina of the People's National Party (PNP) who represented the constituency after winning in the 1979 Ghanaian general election.

Personal life 
Sambian is a Christian.

References 

1928 births
Ghanaian MPs 1969–1972
Progress Party (Ghana) politicians
People from Northern Region (Ghana)
Ghanaian Christians
Ghanaian educators
Living people